The Story of Christine von Herre is a 1921 German silent drama film directed by Ludwig Berger and starring Agnes Straub, Werner Krauss, and Paul Hartmann. It was based on a novella by Heinrich Zschokke. It was shot at the Babelsberg Studios of Decla-Bioscop in Berlin and on location at Glatz in Silesia. The film's sets were designed by the art directors Rudolf Bamberger and Franz Seemann. The film premiered on 30 September 1921 at the UT-Kurfürstendamm and the UT-Nollendorfplatz in Berlin. It was popular at the box office and with critics.

Cast

References

Bibliography

External links

1921 films
Films of the Weimar Republic
German silent feature films
German drama films
Films directed by Ludwig Berger
Films based on short fiction
1921 drama films
Films produced by Erich Pommer
German black-and-white films
Silent drama films
Films shot at Babelsberg Studios
1920s German films
1920s German-language films